Heterojapyx is a genus of diplurans in the family Japygidae.

Species 
 Heterojapyx dux Skorikov, 1911
 Heterojapyx evansi Womersley, 1934
 Heterojapyx gallardi Tillyard, 1924
 Heterojapyx novaezeelandiae (Verhoeff, 1903)
 Heterojapyx pauliani Pagés, 1955
 Heterojapyx tambourinensis Womersley, 1934
 Heterojapyx victoriae Silvestri, 1911

References 

Diplura